The 2010 Tour de Suisse was the 74th edition of the Tour de Suisse stage race. It took place from 12 June to 20 June and was part of both the 2010 UCI ProTour and the World Calendar. It began with a short individual time trial in Lugano and ended with another time trial, in Liestal. The race was won by Fränk Schleck.

Stages

Stage 1
12 June 2010 – Lugano, 7.6 km (Individual time trial)

Stage and General classification after Stage 1

Stage 2
13 June 2010 – Ascona to Sierre, 167.5 km

Stage 3
14 June 2010 – Sierre to Schwarzenburg, 196.6 km

Stage 4
15 June 2010 – Schwarzenburg to Wettingen, 192.2 km

Stage 5
16 June 2010 – Wettingen to Frutigen, 172.5 km

Stage 6
17 June 2010 – Meiringen to La Punt, 213.3 km

Stage 7
18 June 2010 – Savognin to Wetzikon, 204.1 km

Stage 8
19 June 2010 – Wetzikon to Liestal, 172.4 km

Stage 9
20 June 2010 – Liestal, 26.9 km (Individual time trial)

Leadership classification

Final standings

General classification

Teams classification

Points classification

Mountains classification

Sprints classification

References

External links

 

Tour de Suisse
2010 UCI ProTour
2010
Tour de Suisse